Pronocephalidae is a family of trematodes belonging to the order Plagiorchiida.

Genera

Genera:
 Adenogaster Looss, 1901
 Astrochis Poche, 1925
 Buckarootrema Platt & Brooks, 2001

References

Plagiorchiida